Sandra O'Ryan (born December 25, 1960) is a Chilean television, theatre and film actress. She was born in Santiago, Chile. She is the mother of the actress María José Urzúa. Her first television appearance was in 1988 in Vivir Así, but she got fame working in the telenovela Amor a Domicilio and in the film La Rubia de Kennedy. She actually joined MEGA in the comedy/drama show called Otra Vez Papá along with her daughter María José.

Filmography

Telenovelas and TV series
 Vivir así (1988) as Gina
 La intrusa (1989) as Diana
 Acércate más (1990) as Beatriz
 Ellas por ellas (1991) as Claudia
 Fácil de amar (1992) as Marcela
 Doble juego (1993) as Soraya Alafán
 Top secret (1994) as Kelly Román
 Amor a domicilio (1995) as Mireya Zambrano
 Amor a domicilio, la comedia (1996) as Mireya Zambrano
 Adrenalina as Rosario Andrade
 Playa salvaje (1997) as Carla Cumings
 Marparaíso (1998) as Manuela Larraín
 Cerro Alegre (1999) as Alexandra Thompson
 Corazón pirata (2001) as Claudia Gallardo
 17 (2005) as Verónica Salazar
 La Nany (2005) as Profesora Verdugo (1 ep.)
 Los simuladores (2005) as Productora (1 ep.)
 Porky te amo (2006) as Angélica Santa María
 Bakán (2006) as Ana María Correa (12 ep)
 Amor por accidente (2007) as Doctora
 Vivir con 10 (2007) as Nina Fontana
 Otra vez papá (2009) as Mariana

Theatre 
 Teatro en CHV
 Despedida de soltero (2007) as ?
 Lo comido y lo bailado nadie lo quita (2009) as ?
 Amor a dos bandas (2009) as Mariana
 Nano puertas adentro (2009) as Ignacia

Films 
 La rubia de Kennedy (1995) as Margot

External links 
 

1960 births

Living people

Chilean stage actresses

Chilean film actresses
Chilean telenovela actresses
Chilean television personalities
Chilean people of Irish descent
Actresses from Santiago